Vadivel Balaji (17 February 1975 – 10 September 2020) was an Indian television comedian, mimicry artist and actor. He received the nickname Vadivel after gaining fame among audience for imitating popular Tamil comedian Vadivelu's voice in television programmes. He was well known for his works in the television field and appeared in prime time Star Vijay television programmes such as Kalakka Povathu Yaaru (Season 4), Siricha Pochu in Adhu Idhu Yedhu. He also took part as a contestant in the eighth season of the reality television show Jodi Number One. A couple of weeks ago, he was shooting for Mr & Mrs Chinnathirai 2 and had apparently got eliminated as well from the show.

Personal life 
He was married to Jyothilakshmi. They have a son Srikanth and a daughter Sridevi.

Death 
On 24 August 2020, Balaji was admitted in two private hospitals; Billroth Hospital and Vijaya Hospital which were located in Chennai. Balaji reportedly suffered a cardiac attack two weeks ago and was facing severe health complications after that. On 10 September 2020, he was moved to a government hospital just prior to his demise. He died that morning, at the age of 45.

Filmography

Television

Awards and honors 
Star Vijay Television Award - Best Comedy Team (Siricha Pochu)
Kalakka Povathu Yarru Champions (Session 1) - Winner Team Pulikesi (Team Captain)
Kalakka Povathu Yarru Champions (Session 2) - Best Comedian

References

External links 

1975 births
2020 deaths
21st-century Tamil male actors
Deaths from cerebrovascular disease
Indian male comedians
Indian male film actors
Indian television presenters
Male actors in Tamil cinema
People from Madurai
Tamil comedians
Tamil male actors
Tamil television presenters